Gustav Benjamin Schwab (19 June 1792 – 4 November 1850) was a German writer, pastor and publisher.

Life
Gustav Schwab was born in Stuttgart, the son of the philosopher Johann Christoph Schwab:  he was introduced to the humanities early in life. After attending Gymnasium Illustre, he studied as a scholar of Tübinger Stift at University of Tübingen, his first two years studying Philology and Philosophy, and thereafter Theology. While at university he established a literary club and became a close friend of Ludwig Uhland, Karl Varnhagen and Justinus Kerner, with whom he published a collection of poems under the title Deutscher Dichterwald.

In the spring of 1813, he made a journey to northern Germany, where he met Johann Wolfgang von Goethe, Friedrich Schleiermacher, Friedrich Rückert, Friedrich de la Motte Fouqué, Adelbert von Chamisso and others. In 1818 he became a high school teacher in Stuttgart, and in 1837 he started work as a pastor in Gomaringen, near Tübingen. In 1841, he moved back to Stuttgart, where he was first pastor and then from 1845 educational counselor for Stuttgart's high school system. In 1847 he received an honorary Doctorate from his old university.

Schwab's collection of myths and legends of antiquity, Sagen des klassischen Altertums, published from 1838 to 1840, was widely used at German schools and became very influential for the reception of classical antiquity in German classrooms. There is a still available English translation with a foreword of Werner Jaeger

In his later years, he traveled regularly to Überlingen am Bodensee to enjoy the waters at the city's spa; he died in Stuttgart in 1850.

Works
Gedichte (1828)
Das Buch der schönsten Geschichten und Sagen (1837)
Sagen des klassischen Altertums (1838–1840)
Gods and Heroes: Myths and Epics of Ancient Greece

Citations

External links

gutenberg.spiegel.de 

1792 births
1850 deaths
Writers from Stuttgart
People from the Duchy of Württemberg
19th-century German Lutheran clergy
German male writers
People educated at Eberhard-Ludwigs-Gymnasium
Morgenblatt für gebildete Stände editors